Two Drifters (also known as Odete) is a Portuguese feature film directed by João Pedro Rodrigues, produced at the independent production company Rosa Filmes and released in 2005.

Reception
 Cannes Film Festival, 2005 – Méntion Spécial Cinémas de Recherche
 Festival de Cine de Bogotá, 2005 – Bronze Precolumbian Circle
 Festival Entre Vues de Belfort, 2005 – Best Actress for Ana Cristina de Oliveira
 Festival do Rio, 2005
 Milan Film Festival, 2006 – Special mention of the jury
 Bratislava International Film Festival, 2005) – Great Award
 São Paulo International Film Festival, 2005
 Paths of the Portuguese cinema - Best Feature
 Lagos Film Festival, 2006) – Best Supporting Actress for Teresa Madruga
 Seattle International Film Festival, 2006 – Contemporary World Cinema
 Bangkok International Film Festival, 2006
 Portuguese Golden Globes, 2006 - Nomination for the categories of Best Film and Best Actress (Ana Cristina Oliveira)

External links
 
 

Portuguese drama films
2000s Portuguese-language films
2005 films
Films directed by João Pedro Rodrigues
2005 drama films
2005 LGBT-related films
Portuguese LGBT-related films
LGBT-related drama films